Kazi Rafiqul Islam is a Bangladesh Nationalist Party politician and the former Member of Parliament of Bogra-1.

Career
Islam was elected to parliament from Bogra-1 as a Bangladesh Nationalist Party candidate in 2001.

References

Living people
Bangladesh Nationalist Party politicians
8th Jatiya Sangsad members
Year of birth missing (living people)
Place of birth missing (living people)